Brian Gottfried and Dick Stockton were the defending champions, but lost in the third round this year.

Pat Cramer and Mike Estep won the title, defeating Jean-Baptiste Chanfreau and Georges Goven 6–1, 6–1 in the final.

Seeds

Draw

Finals

Top half

Section 1

Section 2

Bottom half

Section 3

Section 4

External links
 Draw

U.S. Pro Indoor
1974 Grand Prix (tennis)